Benbrack at , is the 251st–highest peak in Ireland on the Arderin scale; while it does not have the elevation to be a Vandeleur-Lynam, it has the prominence to rank as a Marilyn. Benbrack is situated on its own small massif to the north of the core Twelve Bens mountain range in the Connemara National Park in Galway, Ireland.

Naming
The name is most likely derived from the lumps of quartzite stones and boulders that are strewn across the summit of Benbrack.

Geography 
Benbrack sits on its own small massif, with Benbaun and the large massif of the core Twelve Bens lying to the south, connected via a deep col called Maumnascalpa to the Bens of Muckanaght  and Benfree ; to the north is Kylemore Lough (and Kylemore Abbey), and across the Lough is the massif of Garraun, which is part of the wider Twelve Bens/Garraun Complex Special Area of Conservation.

Benbrack lies at the intersection of two major U-shaped valleys, with Glencorbet to the east, and Polladirk to the west (Polladirk can be viewed from a popular scenic viewpoint on the summit of Diamond Hill).  To the northwest of Benbrack, is the small valley and river of Mweelin , around which Knockbrack, Benbrack and Benbaun (477 m) form a small horseshoe, popular with walkers.

Hill walking 

The most straightforward route to climb Benbrack is a 5-kilometre 2.5-hour round-trip via its subsidiary peak of Benbaun, starting and ending at the car-park in Kylemore Abbey (L747583); this route can be expanded into the 7-kilometre 3.5 hour Mweelin Horseshoe, by descending via Knockbrack.

Benbrack is also climbed as part of the Glencorbet Horseshoe, a 14-kilometre 6–7 hour circuit of Kylemore River, usually done counter-clockwise, which takes in the peaks of Benbaun (477 metres), Benbrack, Muckanaght (optional), Benfree, Benbaun (729 metres), and ending at Knockpasheemore.

Gallery

Bibliography

See also

Twelve Bens
Mweelrea, major range in Killary Harbour
Maumturks, major range in Connemara
Lists of mountains in Ireland
List of Marilyns in the British Isles

References

External links
MountainViews: The Irish Mountain Website, Benbrack
MountainViews: Irish Online Mountain Database
The Database of British and Irish Hills , the largest database of British Isles mountains ("DoBIH")
Hill Bagging UK & Ireland, the searchable interface for the DoBIH

Marilyns of Ireland
Mountains and hills of County Galway
Geography of County Galway
Mountains under 1000 metres